Poecilopachys is a genus of Australasian orb-weaver spiders first described by Eugène Simon in 1895.

Species
 it contains five species:
Poecilopachys australasia (Griffith & Pidgeon, 1833) (type) – Australia (Queensland, New South Wales), Samoa
Poecilopachys jenningsi (Rainbow, 1899) – Vanuatu
Poecilopachys minutissima Chrysanthus, 1971 – Papua New Guinea (New Ireland)
Poecilopachys speciosa (L. Koch, 1872) – Australia (Queensland)
Poecilopachys verrucosa (L. Koch, 1871) – New Guinea, Australia (Queensland), Samoa

References

Araneidae
Spiders of Asia
Spiders of Oceania
Araneomorphae genera